Rhynchogadus hepaticus is a species of morid cod known only from the Mediterranean Sea where it occurs in the Gulf of Naples and near to Messina.

References
 

Moridae
Monotypic fish genera
Fish of the Mediterranean Sea
Fish of Europe
Fish described in 1884